Audio Dregs is an independent record label run by the electronic musicians and brothers E*vax and E*rock, in Portland, Oregon, USA. It has released records by artists such as Ratatat and Global Goon.

Artists 

 O.Lamm
 Lullatone
 Melodium
 Kinn
 Plants
 Yuichiro Fujimoto
 Semuin
 Strategy 
 Global Goon
 Ratatat
 E*Vax
 E*Rock
 F.S. Blumm
 Lineland
 Harald "Sack" Ziegler
 Inkblot
 Dim Dim
 The Sensualists
 The Grace Period
 Carpet Musics
 Supersprite
 Mumbleboy
 Copy

See also 
 List of electronic music record labels
 List of record labels

External links
 Official site

Electronic music record labels
American independent record labels
Oregon record labels